The Völsung Cycle is a series of legends in Norse mythology that were first recorded in medieval Iceland, but which were also known (as carvings show) in Sweden, Norway, England and (perhaps) the Isle of Man. The original Icelandic tales were greatly expanded with native Scandinavian folklore, including that of Helgi Hundingsbane, which, in turn, originally appears to have been a separate tradition connected to the Ylfings.

Mythological material in this cycle of some twenty Edda poems includes the Völsunga saga and the tale of the Otter's Ransom, and covers much of the same subject matter as the Middle High German epic poem Nibelungenlied.

Contemporary English influence
Material from the cycle was translated into English by such figures as Andrew Lang and Edward Thomas, and had a significant impact on the thought and writings of the Inklings.

See also

References

Further reading
Theodore Andersson, The Legend of Brynhild (1980)

 
Nibelung tradition
Norse mythology